Ellerbach is a river of Rhineland-Palatinate, Germany.

The Ellerbach springs west of Büchel. It is a left tributary of the Moselle at Ediger-Eller.

See also
List of rivers of Rhineland-Palatinate

References

Rivers of Rhineland-Palatinate
Rivers of Germany